The year 1783 in architecture involved some significant architectural events and new buildings.

Events
 September 24 – The Bolshoi Kamenny Theatre, in Saint Petersburg, Russia, designed by Antonio Rinaldi, opens with a performance of Paisiello's opera Il mondo della luna.

Buildings and structures

Buildings completed
 New Vilnius Cathedral in the Grand Duchy of Lithuania, designed by Laurynas Gucevičius, is consecrated.
 Façade of Carmelite Church, Warsaw, Poland, designed by Efraim Szreger, is completed
 Laleli Mosque, Istanbul, Turkey, is rebuilt after a fire.
 Boston Light (lighthouse) rebuilt on the site of an earlier one destroyed in the American Revolution.

Awards
 Grand Prix de Rome, architecture: Antoine Vaudoyer.

Births
 May 14 – Giuseppe Jappelli, Venetian architect (died 1852)
 June 2 – Solomon Willard, Massachusetts craftsman, architect and builder (died 1861)

Deaths
 February 6 – Capability Brown, English landscape architect (born 1716)

References

Architecture
Years in architecture
18th-century architecture